Fantastica Mania 2020 was a professional wrestling show tour, scripted and co-produced by the Japanese New Japan Pro-Wrestling (NJPW) promotion and the Mexican Consejo Mundial de Lucha Libre (CMLL) promotion. The tour started on January 10 and ran until January 21, 2020, with shows taking place in Osaka, Ehime, Kyoto, Aichi, and four shows in Tokyo at Korakuen Hall.

The 2020 tour was the tenth year in a row that NJPW and CMLL has co-promoted shows in Japan under the Fantastica Mania name. With a total of eight shows, the tour tied the 2018 tour and the 2019 tour as the longest in Fantastica Mania history. Select events were shown on Fighting TV Samurai and TV Asahi, or live on NJPW World with subsequent video-on-demand options.

Background
The 2020 Fantastica Mania tour was the tenth year in a row where Japanese wrestling promotion New Japan Pro-Wrestling (NJPW) promoted a series of shows with their Mexican partner promotion Consejo Mundial de Lucha Libre (CMLL). Due to the co-promotional nature of the shows, they rarely feature any development in ongoing NJPW or CMLL storylines, instead the shows generally focus on inter-promotional matches between CMLL and NJPW.

The 2020 tour included 8 shows, the same as the 2019 tour. Starting on Friday January 11 in Osaka at the Edion Arena Osaka, the show then runs through Ehime (January 12), Kyoto (January 13), Aichi (January 16) and four shows in Tokyo at the Korakuen Hall (January  17, 19, 20 and 21). The shows from Korakuen Hall were streamed live on NJPW World.

Storylines
Each of the 2020 Fantastica Mania shows features a number of professional wrestling matches scripted by CMLL and NJPW with some wrestlers involved in scripted feuds. Wrestlers portray either heels (referred to as rudos in Mexico, those that play the part of the "bad guys") or faces (técnicos in Mexico, the "good guy" characters) as they perform.

The CMLL participants for the 2020 tour were announced on October 16, 2019, and included:

The 2020 tour marked the Fantasticamania debut for CMLL wrestlers Negro Casas, Dulce Gardenia, Lucifierno and Tiger. Casas was originally scheduled for the 2018 tour but had to miss it due to injury. For the first time in six years neither Volador Jr. nor Místico participated in the tour. Okumura is the only wrestler to participate in every Fantastica Mania tour, in part because of his role of liaison and translator for those that only speak Spanish on the CMLL contingent. Okumura and Carístico are the only two 2020 participants who were also on the first tour, at the time Carístico was known as "Místico".

Results

January 10
Retired wrestler Jushin Thunder Liger and NJPW chairman Naoki Sugabayashi joined the regular commentary team for the NJPW World broadcast of the event. Before the main event, Sugabayashi presenented OKUMURA with a plaque, commemorating his 25 professional wrestling anniversary.

January 11

January 12

January 13

January 16

January 17

January 19

January 20

See also
2020 in professional wrestling

References

2020 in Tokyo
2020 in professional wrestling
2020
January 2020 events in Japan